The Old Bahama Channel is a strait of the Caribbean region, between Cuba and the Bahamas.

Geography
The strait/channel is located off the Atlantic coast of north-central and northeastern mainland and the Sabana-Camagüey Archipelago of Cuba, and south of the Great Bahama Bank of the Bahamas. It divides the northernmost bank of the Caribbean islands into two nearly equal parts. To the north and northeast is the Great Bahama Bank and the Bahama Islands; and to the south the bank on which the island of Cuba rests.

The Old Bahama Channel is connected at its north-western extremity end to the Florida Straits by two arms, enclosing Cay Sal Bank, of which the northern is called Santaren Channel and the southern Nicholas Channel. It is considered as terminating on the east between Cape Maysi in Cuba, and Inagua island in the Bahamas. However, it can also be considered to include the deep sea which separates the minor banks north of Haiti from this island, so that it extends to the Mona Passage, or the strait between the islands of Hispaniola and Puerto Rico.

The narrowest portion of the Old Bahama Channel is between 22° and 23° North latitude, where its width rarely exceeds .

History
In the 1500s, Alonso  Valiente was one of the discoverers of the Old Bahama Channel.

The Spanish colonial trade routes in the Spanish West Indies originally favored the Old Bahama Channel, then shifted to the Straits of Florida—New Bahama Channel, as it was a safer alternative.

In the Old Bahama Channel, ship captains had to pick their way through the low-lying cays and shoals of the southern Bahama Banks. A Royal Navy vessel, the 44-gun , was wrecked in the Channel in 1762.

References

Straits of the Caribbean
International straits
Bodies of water of Cuba
Bodies of water of the Bahamas
Bahamas–Cuba border
Geography of Camagüey Province
Geography of Ciego de Ávila Province
Geography of Cienfuegos Province
Geography of Guantánamo Province
Geography of Holguín Province
Geography of Sancti Spíritus Province
Geography of Villa Clara Province